Quitman is a city in Cleburne and Faulkner counties in the U.S. state of Arkansas. Its population was 762 at the 2010 census. The portion of the city in Faulkner County is part of the Little Rock–North Little Rock–Conway Metropolitan Statistical Area.

Geography
Quitman is located in southwestern Cleburne County at  (35.381231, -92.218190). It extends southwest along Arkansas Highway 25 into Faulkner County.

Demographics

2020 census

As of the 2020 United States census, there were 694 people, 311 households, and 218 families residing in the city.

2000 census
At the 2000 census there were 714 people in 316 households, including 204 families, in the city. The racial makeup of the city was 98.88% White, 1.04% Native American, 0.14% Asian, and 0.84% from two or more races.  0.42% of the population were Hispanic or Latino of any race.
Of the 316 households 31.3% had children under the age of 18 living with them, 50.6% were married couples living together, 9.8% had a female householder with no husband present, and 35.4% were non-families. 32.6% of households were one person and 20.6% were one person aged 65 or older.  The average household size was 2.26 and the average family size was 2.84.

The age distribution was 25.6% under the age of 18, 8.3% from 18 to 24, 26.3% from 25 to 44, 17.9% from 45 to 64, and 21.8% 65 or older.  The median age was 38 years. For every 100 females, there were 85.0 males.  For every 100 females age 18 and over, there were 80.6 males.

The median household income was $24,375 and the median family income  was $31,964. Males had a median income of $28,750 versus $18,047 for females. The per capita income for the city was $15,537.  About 11.8% of families and 14.0% of the population were below the poverty line, including 12.2% of those under age 18 and 23.2% of those age 65 or over.

Education 
Public education of elementary and secondary school students is available from Quitman School District leading to graduation from Quitman High School.

References

External links

 

Cities in Arkansas
Cities in Cleburne County, Arkansas
Cities in Faulkner County, Arkansas
Cities in Little Rock–North Little Rock–Conway metropolitan area